By the Light of the Moon is a 1911 American single-reel silent film directed and filmed by Edwin S. Porter. It was produced for the Rex Motion Picture Company. It is one of the earliest examples of silhouette animation.

Plot
The story is about a romance between a couple. The run into many obstacles to being together, including interruption by a tramp and disapproval of her parents. They decide to elope in a plane, and her father chases them below in his automobile. They reach the minister's house and elope before the father arrives.

Production and release
By the Light of the Moon was the company's third release. It revived a technique Porter had used in his 1908 film A Comedy in Black and White.

See also
Love by the Light of the Moon, a 1901 film also by Porter

References

External links

Films directed by Edwin S. Porter
American silent short films
American black-and-white films
1911 films
1911 animated films
1910s American animated films
1910s animated short films